Admiral Claude Edward Buckle (7 February 1839 – 7 February 1930) was a Royal Navy officer who became Senior Officer, Coast of Ireland Station.

Naval career
Buckle became commanding officer of the battleship HMS Invincible in May 1884, commanding officer of the battleship HMS Superb in July 1886 and commanding officer of the battleship HMS Hercules in April 1887. He went on to be Senior Officer, Coast of Ireland Station in January 1895 before he retired in January 1898.

References

1839 births
1930 deaths
Royal Navy admirals